Vias is a commune in the Hérault department in the Occitanie region in southern France.

It is a popular holiday destination, with many camp and caravan sites. Near Vias, the Canal du midi crosses the river Libron, an interesting historic engineering work. Vias station has rail connections to Narbonne, Montpellier and Avignon.

Population

Energy
Around 17% of the commune's electricity is provided by local solar power installations.

See also
Communes of the Hérault department

References

External links

 Vias tourism
 Vias town

Communes of Hérault